Acanthoctenus is a genus of Central to South American wandering spiders first described by Eugen von Keyserling in 1877.

Species 
Acanthoctenus currently contains 13 described species:
Acanthoctenus alux  – Guatemala
Acanthoctenus chickeringi  – Panama
Acanthoctenus dumicola  – Venezuela
Acanthoctenus gaujoni Simon, 1906 – Venezuela, Ecuador
Acanthoctenus kollari (Reimoser, 1939) – Costa Rica
Acanthoctenus lamarrei  – Panama
Acanthoctenus manauara  – Brazil
Acanthoctenus plebejus Simon, 1906 – Venezuela, Peru
Acanthoctenus remotus Chickering, 1960 – Jamaica
Acanthoctenus spiniger Keyserling, 1877 (type) – Mexico to Venezuela
Acanthoctenus spinipes Keyserling, 1877 – Guatemala to Paraguay
Acanthoctenus torotoro  – Bolivia
Acanthoctenus virginea  – El Salvador
Incertae sedis:

 Acanthoctenus maculatus Petrunkevitch, 1925 – Panama (species inquirenda)

 Acanthoctenus obauratus Simon, 1906 – Brazil
 Acanthoctenus rubrotaeniatus Mello-Leitão, 1947 – Brazil

Acanthoctenus mammifer was formerly placed in this genus, but was transferred to the genus Viracucha.

References

Araneomorphae genera
Ctenidae
Taxa named by Eugen von Keyserling